Otter Creek Township may refer to:

Illinois
 Otter Creek Township, Jersey County, Illinois
 Otter Creek Township, LaSalle County, Illinois

Indiana
 Otter Creek Township, Ripley County, Indiana
 Otter Creek Township, Vigo County, Indiana

Iowa
 Otter Creek Township, Crawford County, Iowa
 Otter Creek Township, Jackson County, Iowa
 Otter Creek Township, Linn County, Iowa
 Otter Creek Township, Lucas County, Iowa
 Otter Creek Township, Tama County, Iowa

Kansas
 Otter Creek Township, Greenwood County, Kansas

Nebraska
 Ottercreek Township, Dixon County, Nebraska

North Dakota
 Otter Creek Township, Grant County, North Dakota, in Grant County, North Dakota

Pennsylvania
 Otter Creek Township, Mercer County, Pennsylvania

Township name disambiguation pages